Stigmella argyrodoxa is a moth of the family Nepticulidae. It is known from Bengal in India.

The larvae feed on Desmodium species. They probably mine the leaves of their host plant.

External links
Nepticulidae and Opostegidae of the world

Nepticulidae
Moths of Asia
Moths described in 1918